Jungle Raiders is a 1985 adventure film directed by Antonio Margheriti. The film stars Christopher Connelly and Lee Van Cleef.

Plot
Captain Yankee (Christopher Connelly) and his friend make a living by selling fake adventure dreams to rich foreigners. With the help of some natives they let their rich clients think they have lived fantastic adventures. One day a Colombian museum director arrives to search for a fabulous "ruby of doom," and Captain Yankee is blackmailed into accepting the task.

Cast
Christopher Connelly as Captain Yankee
Lee Van Cleef as Warren
Marina Costa as Maria Janez
Luciano Pigozzi as Gin Fizz (as Alan Collins)
Dario Pontonutti    
Mike Monty    
Rene Abadeza as Alain

Releases
Jungle Raiders was released in 1985.

Reception
In a retrospective review, Jeremy Wheeler (AllMovie) stated described the film as "Raiders of the Lost Ark rip-off that did its homework" noting that it directly stole dialogue and scenes from the film including the snake pit scene and a kidnapping in an open market with laundry baskets. The review concluded to not "expect much else from this cheap Italian knock-off."

Footnotes

Sources

External links

Jungle Raiders at Variety Distribution

1985 films
1980s Italian-language films

1980s adventure films
Films directed by Antonio Margheriti
Italian adventure films
Treasure hunt films
1980s Italian films